Beaverbrooks is a British jeweller. Established in 1919, with the opening of its first store in Belfast and still a family-owned business, with direct descendants of the founders, (the third and fourth generations of the Adlestone family), the custodians. The current Managing Director Anna Blackburn has worked for Beaverbrooks for 21 years, starting her career working in the Trafford branch and working her way up the ranks. She was appointed CEO in September 2013, becoming not only the first female CEO of the company but the first non-family CEO in the company's history. In 2018, Anna was appointed managing director, becoming only the second-ever non-family member to sit on the board.

Awards and recognition
In 2009,Beaverbrooks staff were identified as the most content in the country, according to the Sunday Times, with the company topping the newspaper's annual rankings of the ‘100 Best Companies to Work For’ in that year. They've appeared in the list for 17 consecutive years. In 2020, they were named the 9th Best Company To Work For and Best Place To Work at the Retail Week Awards.
1st in the Sunday Times' 'Best Companies to Work for' 2009 
 Best Workplace in Europe 2008 
 UK Jewellery Awards- Multiple Retailer of the Year, Retail Employer of the Year

References

Jewellery retailers of the United Kingdom
Design companies established in 1919
1919 establishments in Ireland
Retail companies established in 1919